Sam Lee may refer to:

Sam Lee (actor) (born 1975), Hong Kong actor
Sam Lee (tennis) (born 1914 or 1915), American tennis player
Sam Lee (singer) (born 1973), Taiwanese singer and songwriter
Sam Lee (folk musician) (born 1980), British folk musician
 Sam Lee, independent candidate in the 2021 Hartlepool by-election for the UK parliament

See also
Sammy Lee (disambiguation)
Samuel Lee (disambiguation)